Walter Alfred Rigney (1 January 1898 – c. 1965) was a rugby union player who represented Australia. Rigney, a flanker, was born in Sydney and claimed a total of 3 international rugby caps for Australia.

References

Australian rugby union players
Australia international rugby union players
1898 births
1960s deaths
Rugby union flankers
Rugby union players from Sydney